In mathematics, in particular in field theory and real algebra, a formally real field is a field that can be equipped with a (not necessarily unique) ordering that makes it an ordered field.

Alternative definitions
The definition given above is not a first-order definition, as it requires quantifiers over sets. However, the following criteria can be coded as (infinitely many) first-order sentences in the language of fields and are equivalent to the above definition.

A formally real field F is a field that also satisfies one of the following equivalent properties:

 −1 is not a sum of squares in F.  In other words, the Stufe of F is infinite. (In particular, such a field must have characteristic 0, since in a field of characteristic p the element −1 is a sum of 1s.)
 There exists an element of F that is not a sum of squares in F, and the characteristic of F is not 2.
 If any sum of squares of elements of F equals zero, then each of those elements must be zero.

It is easy to see that these three properties are equivalent. It is also easy to see that a field that admits an ordering must satisfy these three properties.

A proof that if F satisfies these three properties, then F admits an ordering uses the notion of prepositive cones and positive cones. Suppose −1 is not a sum of squares; then a Zorn's Lemma argument shows that the prepositive cone of sums of squares can be extended to a positive cone . One uses this positive cone to define an ordering:  if and only if  belongs to P.

Real closed fields

A formally real field with no formally real proper algebraic extension is a real closed field.  If K is formally real and Ω is an algebraically closed field containing K, then there is a real closed subfield of Ω containing K.  A real closed field can be ordered in a unique way, and the non-negative elements are exactly the squares.

Notes

References

 

Field (mathematics)
Ordered groups

pl:Ciało (formalnie) rzeczywiste